Sarah Jane (born 25 February 1977), better known by her stage name Sarah Jezebel Deva, is an English singer. She was the female soprano vocalist for Cradle of Filth for 14 years and the frontwoman of the band Angtoria for 10 years. In 2009, Deva started her self-titled solo project, releasing two studio albums and one EP from 2010 to 2012, and in 2020 announced she would be working with former Angtoria bandmate Chris Rehn on a new project entitled Torn Between Two Worlds.

Early life

Deva was raised in East Ham, London and has two half sisters and three half brothers. She had a troubled and turbulent childhood, leaving home when she was nine years old. Her godmother influenced her life greatly, getting her on the path to music.

Career
Deva's career started at the age of 11 at the Queen's Theatre, Hornchurch, Essex. A cover of Ella Fitzgerald's "Summertime" was her first performance in a live band and totally unrehearsed; she performed one more time there at the age of 13. Deva went on to write her own lyrics and later recorded a demo on her friend's 8-track console. Her first band was called Mad Dog, a punk group in which she was co-vocalist. She only did one show with the band, in Tunbridge Wells, Kent, supporting the punk band 999. Paul Allender and Dani Filth, founders of extreme metal band Cradle of Filth, would later meet Deva through mutual friends.

After leaving Cradle of Filth in 2009, Deva started her self-titled solo project with Ken Newman and signed a deal with a small British record company. A Sign of Sublime, the debut album, was released on 15 February 2010. A European and UK tour followed inclusive of a performance at Femme Metal Festival.

After various issues with the label, Deva left the record company and joined forces with Dan Abela, a musician and producer. Together, they co-wrote The Corruption of Mercy after signing a three-album record deal with Listenable Records in March 2011. The album was released on 27 June 2011.

In December of 2020 Deva announced via her Facebook page that she and former Angtoria bandmate Chris Rehn would be releasing new music under the name Torn Between Two Worlds. The duo's first single "The Beauty of Deception" will be released on January 31, 2021.

Discography
Solo career
 A Sign of Sublime (2010)
 The Corruption of Mercy (2011)
 Malediction (EP) (2012)

Mad Dog
 Howling at the Moon (1993)

With Cradle of Filth
 V Empire or Dark Faerytales in Phallustein (1996)
 Dusk... and Her Embrace (1996)
 Cruelty and the Beast (1998)
 From the Cradle to Enslave (1999)
 Midian (2000)
 Bitter Suites to Succubi (2001)
 Heavy, Left-Handed and Candid (2001)
 Lovecraft & Witch Hearts (2002)
 Live Bait for the Dead (2002)
 Damnation and a Day (2003)
 Nymphetamine (2004)
 Peace Through Superior Firepower (2005)
 Thornography (2006)
 Godspeed on the Devil's Thunder (2008)
 Midnight in the Labyrinth (2012)

With Creation's Tears
 Methods to End It All (2010)

With The Kovenant
 Nexus Polaris (1998)

With Tulus
 Mysterion (1997)

With Therion
 Vovin (1998)
 Crowning of Atlantis (1999)
 Live in Midgård (2002)
 Celebrators of Becoming (2006)

With Graveworm
 Underneath the Crescent Moon (1998)

With Mortiis
 The Stargate (1998)
 The Smell of Rain (2001)

With Mystic Circle
 Infernal Satanic Verses (1999)

With The Gathering
 Black Light District (2002)

With Mendeed
 From Shadows Came Darkness (2004)

Angtoria
 God Has a Plan for Us All (2006)

Trigger the Bloodshed
Purgation (2008)

Hecate Enthroned
Virulent Rapture (2013)
Embrace of the Godless Aeon (2019)

Torn Between Two Worlds
The Beauty of Deception (Single) (2021)

Various artists
 Emerald / A Tribute to the Wild One (Thin Lizzy tribute) (2003) ("Southbound" with Therion)
 The Lotus Eaters (Dead Can Dance tribute) (2004) ("The Wind That Shakes the Barley")

References

External links 
 Official website (archived)

1977 births
Living people
Cradle of Filth members
English women singers
English heavy metal singers
Women heavy metal singers
People from Forest Gate
Therion (band) members
The Kovenant members
Listenable Records artists
Women in metal